One Park Tower may refer to:

One Park Tower (Atlanta), also known as 34 Peachtree Street
One Park Tower (Mississauga), a high-rise building in Mississauga